Gilbert Normand,  (born March 31, 1943) is a physician and former politician in Quebec, Canada.

Normand has been a member of the Quebec College of Physicians since 1970, and was a practising physician for twenty-seven years, including two decades as a general practitioner doctor-physician in private practice.

In the 1997 general election, Normand ran and won a seat in the House of Commons of Canada as Liberal Member of Parliament for Bellechasse—Etchemins—Montmagny—L'Islet. Prime Minister Jean Chrétien appointed him Secretary of State for Agriculture, Agri-food, Fisheries and Oceans soon after the election. In 1999, he became Secretary of State for Science, Research and Development. He retained his seat in the 2000 federal election, but left his position as a Secretary of State in 2002 to become a backbencher. He was not a candidate in the 2004 federal election.

In 2005, Normand was appointed medical director of EPIDERMA, Quebec's largest laser hair removal network.

References

1943 births
Living people
Members of the 26th Canadian Ministry
Members of the House of Commons of Canada from Quebec
Liberal Party of Canada MPs
Canadian general practitioners
Members of the King's Privy Council for Canada